Akuressa Maha Vidyalaya is a mix school in Akuressa, Sri Lanka. Though it was originally a Buddhist school, now it is run by the Government of Sri Lanka as a Provincial School. Akuressa Maha Vidyalaya has two sections - the Primary section, serves students from Grade 1 to Grade 5 and the Secondary section, serves students from Grade 6 to Grade 13.

Schools in Matara District